Shafiqul Islam is a politician from Sirajganj District of Bangladesh. He was elected a member of parliament from Sirajganj-1 in 1988 Bangladeshi general election.

Career 
Shafiqul Islam was elected a Member of Parliament from Sirajganj-1 constituency as an  independent candidate in the 1988 Bangladeshi general election.

References 

Living people
Year of birth missing (living people)
People from Sirajganj District
Jatiya Party (Ershad) politicians
4th Jatiya Sangsad members